SSG may refer to:

 School of Geodesy and Geomatics
 Sermiligaaq Heliport (IATA: SGG)
 Silicon Gulch Gazette, a West Coast Computer Faire-related gazette by Jim Warren between 1977 and 1985
 Societe Generale Group
 Sultanganj railway station (station code:SGG), Bihar, India
 Supergiant Games
 Swiss-German Sign Language (ISO 639:sgg)
 Sega Game Gear